Myrtle Beach Mall is a regional shopping mall located in Briarcliffe Acres, South Carolina, United States.  The mall has  of GLA space.

Description 
The Myrtle Beach Mall is located adjacent to the intersection of 22 and 17 in Briarcliffe Acres, South Carolina. The mall includes a Belk (Men's and Women's stores), AMC Theatres, Books-A-Million, South Carolina's only Bass Pro Shops Outdoor World, and Players Choice Myrtle Beach (Comic book trading store and 80's video arcade). The mall formerly had a Foot Locker, Hallmark, and a Bath and Body Works all of which have closed.  The mall has fewer than 40 stores in total.

History
The mall originally opened in 1986 as "Briarcliffe Mall", with the name later changing to "Colonial Mall Myrtle Beach."  It was the second mall to open in the area, with the first being the now-defunct Myrtle Square Mall.  The name was changed to Myrtle Beach Mall in 2007 after being purchased by Jones Lang LaSalle, who acquired it from Colonial Properties Trust in July 2007. The mall's last major update was in 2004. It is one of three malls in the Grand Strand area.  The super-regional Coastal Grand Mall is located to the south in Myrtle Beach and the other being Inlet Square Mall in Murrells Inlet.

In the early 2000s, a Bass Pro Shops was added, after Kmart which had previously anchored the mall at that end was demolished. The Myrtle Beach Mall store is the only Bass Pro Shops location in South Carolina, and has helped keep the mall a viable retail establishment in the Grand Strand. The second Belk store was added in 1994, as the original Belk store required expansion but was landlocked.

On May 17, 2014, it was announced Peak Financial Partners, a private real estate investment firm, as well as Msuma Holdings Corp acquired the mall for $45 million.

On May 22, 2014, it was reported that the new owners of the Myrtle Beach Mall say that architects have already developed a couple of new concepts for the mall and there are plans to change the mall in order to attract more shoppers. The first changes would be a redesign of the food court, followed by a conversion of the center of the mall, the theater area and the mall's front.

On January 17, 2020, it was announced that JCPenney would be closing as part of a plan to close 6 stores nationwide. The store closed on July 26, 2020.

Anchors
AMC Theatres
Bass Pro Shops
Belk East
Belk North
JCPenney (closed July 26, 2020)

References

External links 
 Myrtle Beach Mall

JLL (company)
Shopping malls established in 1986
Shopping malls in South Carolina
Shopping malls in Horry County, South Carolina